Here Comes Trouble is an album by the Eyeliners, released in 2000.

Critical reception
AllMusic wrote that "if Rizzo from Grease got cloned three times and they started their own band, it would definitely sound something like the Eyeliners." The Chicago Tribune wrote the band have "internalized [the Ramones'] way of pounding home massive garage-pop hooks with buzz-saw punk ferocity." The Arizona Republic stated that the band "have a knack for taking classic rock and roll and reinventing it with sassy punk-rock attitude."

Track listing
"Here Comes Trouble!" 1:12
"Party Til the Break of Dawn" 2:04
"Johnny Lockheart" 2:13
"See You Tonight" 1:59
"So What?!" 1:16
"Stuck on You" 2:06
"That's the Way It Goes" 2:26
"Rock & Roll Baby" 2:51
"Don't Go" 1:38
"Ooh Way Ooh (I Don't Like You)" 1:40
"Punk Rock Planet" 1:59
"Do the Zombie" 2:05
"If I Were You" 2:06
"Nothing Left to Say" 2:22

References

2000 albums
Lookout! Records albums